The Deutsche Reichsbahn  or DR (German Reich Railways) was the operating name of state owned railways in the German Democratic Republic (East Germany), and after German reunification until 1 January 1994.

In 1949, occupied Germany's railways were returned to German control after four years of Allied control following World War II. Those in the Soviet occupation zone (which became the German Democratic Republic or GDR on 7 October 1949) continued to run as the Deutsche Reichsbahn, the name given to the German national railways in 1937. In West Germany, the Reichsbahn was succeeded by the Deutsche Bundesbahn (DB).

Both the Reichsbahn and the Bundesbahn continued as separate entities until 1994, when they merged to form the Deutsche Bahn.

Organisation
The DR was the largest employer in the GDR and as a state-owned firm was directly subordinated to the GDR Ministry of Transport (Ministerium für Verkehr der DDR). From November 1954 until November 1989, the GDR Minister of Transport also occupied the position of the Director General of the DR (Generaldirektor der Deutschen Reichsbahn).  The headquarters of the DR were located in East Berlin at No. 33 Voßstraße, close to the Berlin Wall and across from the site of the former Reich Chancellery.

The company was administratively subdivided into eight regional directorates (Reichsbahndirektionen) with headquarters in Berlin, Cottbus, Dresden, Erfurt, Greifswald, Halle, Magdeburg, and Schwerin.

Catering services to the DR, both on board trains and in stations, were provided by Mitropa.

Passenger service
The DR was centrally directed according to socialist principles within the context of a centrally-planned command economy.  By 1989, 17.2% of the passenger transport volume in the GDR was handled by the DR – three times the market share of the Deutsche Bundesbahn (DB) in West Germany.  Fares were fairly cheap, but trains tended to be overcrowded and slow, owing in part to the poor condition of most railway lines in the GDR.  The DR did offer a limited number of express trains such as the "Neptun" (Berlin – Copenhagen), "Vindobona" (Berlin – Vienna), "Karlex" (Berlin – Carlsbad), and "Balt-Orient-Express" (Berlin – Bucharest).

Electrification
 
Steam engines were the workhorses after the war and remained important for a long time into the period of German partition. The DR's last steam engine (on normal-gauge tracks) was taken out of service on 28 May 1988. Much of the electrified rail network that existed in (present-day) eastern Germany in 1945 had been removed and sent to the Soviet Union as war reparations in the early years of Soviet occupation.  By the early 1970s, only a small portion of the tracks in the GDR had been electrified in comparison with those in Western Europe; the GDR leadership chose to reduce the pace of electrification and instead relied on mostly Russian-made diesel locomotives due to the easy availability of fuel from the Soviet Union at subsidised prices.

When the GDR's energy costs began to rise dramatically in the early 1980s (in part because the Soviet Union ceased to subsidize the price of fuel sold to the GDR), the DR embarked on a large rail electrification campaign as the GDR's electrical power grid could be supplied with electricity generated from the burning of domestically-produced lignite. The electrified rail network grew from 11.5% in 1979 to 27.3% by 1990.

The DR in Berlin during the Cold War
Due to the Four-Power Occupation Agreements for Berlin, in which the long-term division of Germany and Berlin (the partition of Germany into two German states; and Berlin partitioned into two principal zones of occupation, West Berlin and East Berlin) was not foreseen, the DR operated the long-haul railway service (Fernverkehr) and barge canals in both East and West Berlin throughout the years of the Cold War (and also after the reunification of Germany) until the merger of the DR and DB in January 1994.  This led to unique situations due to the occupied status of West Berlin and the presence of the DR there.  For example, there were Bahnpolizei (railway police) employed by the DR in their West Berlin railway stations who were controlled by the GDR Interior Ministry, although the three Western Allies (the United States, Great Britain, and France) never officially recognized the authority of the GDR government in the Soviet (Eastern) sector of Berlin, let alone in West Berlin.  For this reason, the West Berlin Polizei had separate patrols who were empowered to maintain law and order in the West Berlin railway stations.

The West German Deutsche Bundesbahn (DB) maintained a ticket office in West Berlin for many years on Hardenbergstraße near the main Zoological Garden railway station that was run by the Eastern Reichsbahn.  One reason for this was due to the generally poor customer service offered at the DR's ticket counters .  Another reason may have been psychological – to promote a visible West German government presence in West Berlin.

Another oddity was the presence of a ticket counter at the East Berlin station Berlin Ostbahnhof (known as Berlin Hauptbahnhof from 1987 to 1998) operated by the Soviet (later Russian) military to facilitate transport of their personnel to and from Russia.  A special military train regularly operated between Berlin and Moscow until 1994 when the Russian military finally withdrew from Germany.  Each of the Western Allies also maintained their stations and ticket offices in their respective zones:

United States: Lichterfelde West;
United Kingdom: Charlottenburg; and
France: Tegel.

The Western Allies operated military trains over DR lines converging on the route between Berlin-Wannsee and Marienborn.  DR conductors and engine crews managed these trains while military transport officers and soldiers dealt with their passengers and the Soviet military checkpoint officials at Marienborn.

The presence of the DR in West Berlin was costly to the GDR – the annual operating deficit for the DR in West Berlin in the early 1980s was estimated to be around 120-140 million Deutsche Marks.  The status of Berlin is also believed  to be the reason the East Germans retained the name Deutsche Reichsbahn as it was mentioned as such in transit treaties. After the foundation of East Germany on 7 October 1949 the East German government continued to run all the railways in its territory under the official name Deutsche Reichsbahn, by so doing it maintained responsibility for almost all railway transport in all four sectors of Berlin. Had the DR been renamed, for example, Staatseisenbahn der DDR (State Railways of the GDR) along the lines of other East German institutions, the Western Allies would probably have refused to recognise it as the same or a successor organization and removed its right to operate in West Berlin. The legal necessity of keeping the term 'Deutsche Reichsbahn' explains the unique use of the word 'Reich' (with its Imperial and Nazi connotations) in the name of an official organisation of the communist GDR. This quasi-official presence in West Berlin was apparently of an utmost importance to the GDR regime, otherwise it is hard to explain why the anti-imperialist and cash-strapped GDR government was willing to both continue using the word 'Reich' and incur large hard currency deficits to operate and maintain the West Berlin railway system.

The S-Bahn in West Berlin during the Cold War
 The DR also operated the S-Bahn local train service in West Berlin during much of the Cold War period.   Following the erection of the Berlin Wall on 13 August 1961, many West Berliners boycotted the S-Bahn in West Berlin.  After a strike by West Berlin-based DR employees in September 1980, the S-Bahn service in West Berlin was greatly reduced.  Almost half of the West Berlin S-Bahn railway network was closed following this action, including the closure of the western portion of the Berlin circular ring railway (Ringbahn).   On 9 January 1984, a treaty between the GDR and the West Berlin Senate entered into force and turned over the responsibility for the operation of the S-Bahn in West Berlin to the West Berlin transport authority BVG.  The BVG gradually restored much of the S-Bahn service that had been previously reduced.  Following the reunification in October 1990, the arrangements were kept until the creation of Deutsche Bahn AG on 1 January 1994 when the new company took over all S-Bahn operations in the Greater Berlin region.

It took several years to fully restore all of S-Bahn services throughout the Greater Berlin region.  Service on the West Berlin portion of the Ringbahn was not restored until after reunification (in phases, from 1993 to 2002).  Capital projects continue to address the backlog of construction needs that developed during the DR-GDR era.

The DR after the reunification of Germany
Article 26 of the Unification Treaty (Einigungsvertrag) between the two German states signed on 31 August 1990 established the DR as special property (Sondervermögen) of the Federal Republic of Germany, and stipulated the DR to be merged with DB at the earliest opportunity. Upon reunification, the DR and DB continued to operate as separate entities in their respective service areas, albeit under a coordination agreement concerning operations. On 1 June 1992, the DB and DR formed a joint board of directors which governed both entities. The merger between the DR and DB was delayed by several years over the structure of the merged railway due to concerns by German politicians on the ever-increasing annual operating deficits incurred by the DB and DR. The Federal Ministry of Transport (Bundesverkehrsministerium) proposed a comprehensive reform of the German railway system (Bahnreform) which was approved by the Bundestag in 1993 and went into effect on 1 January 1994, that included the planned merger between the DR and DB on 1 January 1994 to form the Deutsche Bahn Aktiengesellschaft or AG (Corporation), which is a state-owned limited stock company.

Directors General of the DR
Willi Besener (1946–1949)
Willi Kreikemeyer (1949–1950)
Erwin Kramer1 (1950–1970)
Otto Arndt1 (1970–1989)
Herbert Keddi (1989–1990)
Hans Klemm (1990–1991)
Heinz Dürr (1991–1992)

(1) Was also GDR Minister of Transport during his term of service as Director General of the DR.

Chairman of the board of the DR
Heinz Dürr (1991–1992)

Dürr was also concurrently chairman of the board of the DB.  He later served as the chairman of the joint board of directors of the DB and DR from June 1992 – January 1994.

See also
List of East German Deutsche Reichsbahn locomotives and railbuses
Deutsche Reichsbahn service ranks
Berlin S-Bahn
Interflug

References

External links

  "Berlin 1969" includes sections on Marienborn-Berlin rail operations.

 
Government organisations in East Germany
Railway companies established in 1949
Railway companies disestablished in 1993
History of rail transport in Germany
Rail transport in East Germany
1949 establishments in East Germany
German companies disestablished in 1993